Andrew Keenan-Bolger is an American actor. He is best known for originating the roles of Crutchie in Newsies, and Jesse Tuck in Tuck Everlasting on Broadway. His other Broadway credits include Robertson Ay in Mary Poppins, Jojo in Seussical, Chip in Beauty and the Beast and Young Scrooge in A Christmas Carol.

In 2010, Keenan-Bolger co-created the web series Submissions Only with Kate Wetherhead. He serves as the series' director and editor. He has also directed two short films, Sign and The Ceiling Fan.

Early life and education
A Detroit native, Keenan-Bolger is the brother of Celia Keenan-Bolger and Maggie Keenan-Bolger. He graduated from Renaissance High School and the University of Michigan, where he received with a Bachelor of Fine Arts, in musical theatre, in 2007.

Career
As a teenager, Keenan-Bolger was in the original 2000 cast of Seussical on Broadway, as an alternate Jojo. He has also appeared on Broadway in Beauty and the Beast as Chip, and A Christmas Carol as Young Scrooge. The actor was featured in the first national tours of The 25th Annual Putnam County Spelling Bee as Leaf Coneybear, Ragtime as the Little Boy, and How the Grinch Stole Christmas as Young Max. Other theater credits include High School Musical on Stage! at North Shore Music Theatre and Perez Hilton Saves the Universe at the 2008 Fringe Festival.

He has also been seen on television as Christophe on the series The Naked Brothers Band and as a weekly commentator on FNMTV on MTV. His film credits include Beauty and the Beast: The Enchanted Christmas and Marci X.

Keenan-Bolger created a video blog to promote North Shore Music Theatre's production of High School Musical in which he starred. Keenan-Bolger was a regular on fellow web series "The Battery's Down". He is noted for his performance of the song 'You're in Vegas' which is available for download on iTunes.

In 2010, Keenan-Bolger co-created the web series Submissions Only with fellow Broadway performer Kate Wetherhead. He serves as the series' director and editor.

On October 12, 2010, he took over the role of Robertson Ay in the Broadway production of Disney's Mary Poppins and later played the part on the National tour. He created the role of Omar in the 5th Avenue Theater production of Disney's Aladdin (July 2011) and played Crutchie in Disney's Newsies (March 2012), a role he originally created at the Paper Mill Playhouse (September 2011). His last performance date as Crutchie was on March 11, 2013, so he could begin rehearsal for his role in the musical adaptation of Tuck Everlasting. He was supposed to star as Jesse Tuck, with performances beginning on July 28, 2013, at Boston's Colonial Theatre, but the show was delayed due to the lack of availability of a suitable theatre for its subsequent transfer to New York. He next performed in A.R. Gurney's drama Family Furniture, which ran from November 12 to December 22, 2013, at The Flea Theater in the TriBeCa section of New York City. He played the part of Billy Frazier in the 2014 romantic comedy film The Rewrite, starring Hugh Grant and Marisa Tomei.

He revisited the role of Jesse Tuck in the Broadway production of Tuck Everlasting which opened on April 26, 2016, and ran until May 29, 2016.

On May 23, 2017, Bolger revisited his role of Crutchie in the Newsies Musical Film.

Personal life
Keenan-Bolger married Scott Bixby, the former White House reporter for The Daily Beast, on October 13, 2018.

Filmography

Film and television

Broadway and Off-Broadway

Tour

Regional and other theatre

Concerts

Web

Scripted podcasts

Bibliography
Jack and Louisa: Act 1 (w/ Kate Wetherhead), 2015
Jack and Louisa: Act 2 (w/ Kate Wetherhead), 2016
Jack and Louisa: Act 3 (w/ Kate Wetherhead), 2017

Awards and nominations

References

External links 

 (archive)
Webseries Submissions Only on YouTube

American male musical theatre actors
University of Michigan School of Music, Theatre & Dance alumni
Male actors from Detroit
Living people
American gay actors
LGBT people from Michigan
Renaissance High School alumni
21st-century LGBT people
1985 births